This list of lakes in France roughly distinguishes three categories: the mountain lakes, sorted first by massif, and then by départements; the lakes in plains, sorted by river basin; and the coastal lakes.

Mountain lakes

The lakes of mountain massifs can be natural, often of glaciary origin (G), or volcanic (V), or artificial, generally built for hydraulic energy purposes (H) or flow regulation (F).

Alps

Alpes-de-Haute-Provence
 Lac d'Allos in the Mercantour National Park
 Lac Bleu in the Haute-Ubaye
 Lac Bleu-italien in the Haute-Ubaye
 Lacs du col-de-Longet in the Haute-Ubaye
 Lac d'Esparron
 Lac de l'Étoile in the Haute-Ubaye
 Lac du Lauzanier
 Lac long in the Haute-Ubaye
 Lac de Longet in the Haute-Ubaye
 Lac-grand de Marinet in the Haute-Ubaye
 Lac-petit de Marinet in the Haute-Ubaye
 Lac des Neuf Couleurs in the Haute-Ubaye
 Lac Noir in the Haute-Ubaye
 Lac de la Noire in the Haute-Ubaye
 Lac Rond in the Haute-Ubaye
 Lac de Serre-Ponçon (H) (F)
 Lac Vert in the Haute-Ubaye

Hautes-Alpes

 Grand Lac in the Briançonnais
 Lac de l'Ascension in the Queyras
 Lac d'Asti in the Queyras
 Lac des Béraudes in the Briançonnais
 Lac de la Blanche in the Queyras
 Lac Blanchet in the Queyras
 Lac Chalantiés in the Queyras
 Lac Clausis in the Queyras
 Lac de Combeynot in the massif des Écrins
 Lac des Cordes in the Queyras
 Lac du Crachet in the Embrunnais
 Lac de Cristol in the Briançonnais
 Lac de Dormillouse in the massif des Écrins
 Lac Haut-des-Drayères or Lac sans-nom-au-dessus-des-Drayères, in the Briançonnais
 Lac Égorgeou in the Queyras
 Lac Escur in the Queyras
 Lac des Estaris in the massif des Écrins
 Lac de l'Eychassier in the Queyras
 Lac de l'Eychauda in the massif des Écrins
 Lac Faravel in the massif des Écrins
 Lac Foréant in the Queyras
 Lac Gimont in the Briançonnais
 Lac Jean Rostand in the Queyras
 Lacs Jumeaux in the massif des Écrins
 Lac Lacroix in the Queyras
 Lac Lestio in the Queyras
 Lac Laramon in the Briançonnais
 Grand lac du Lauzet in the Queyras
 Lac moyen du Lauzet in the Queyras
 Lac du Lauzon in the massif des Écrins
 Lac Lauzon in the Queyras
 Lac Lauzon de Furfande in the Queyras
 Lac Long in the Briançonnais
 Lac Long in the massif des Écrins
 Lac Malrif in the Queyras
 Lac Mézan in the Queyras
 Lac Miroir in the Queyras
 Lac des Muandes in the Briançonnais
 Lac Néal in the Queyras
 Lac Haut-Néal or Lac sans-nom-au-dessus-du-Lac-Néal, in the Queyras
 Lac des Neuf-couleurs in the Queyras
 Lac Noir in the Briançonnais
 Lac d'Orcières-Merlette
 Grand lac de l'Oule in the Briançonnais
 Lac de l'Orceyrette in the Briançonnais
 Lac Palluel in the massif des Écrins
 Lac Petit-Laus in the Queyras
 Lac Peyron in the Briançonnais
 Lac des Pisses in the massif des Écrins
 Lac de la Ponsonnière in the Briançonnais
 Lac Profond in the massif des Écrins
 Lac de Puy Vachier in the massif des Écrins
 Lac de Rasis in the Queyras
 Lac ouest de Rasis in the Queyras
 Lac Rond in the Briançonnais
 Lac des Rouites in the Queyras
 Lac Sainte-Anne in the Queyras
 Lac Sainte-Marguerite in the Embrunnais
 Lac Saraille in the Briançonnais
 Lac du Serpent in the Briançonnais
 Lac des Sirènes in the massif des Écrins
 Lac Soulier in the Queyras
 Lac de Souliers

Alpes-Maritimes
 Lac Autier in the Mercantour-Argentera
 Lac des Babarottes in the Tinée
 Lac Balaour (Isolette) in the Vésubie
 Lac du Barn in the Vésubie
 Lac de Beuil in the Cians
 Lacs Bessons in the Vésubie
 Lac Blanc in the Vésubie
 Lac du Boréon in the Vésubie
 Lacs des Bresses in the Vésubie
 Lac Cabret in the Vésubie
 Lac Chaffour in the Tinée
 Lac du Cimon in the Tinée
 Lacs de l'Estrop (Entraunes)
 Lac de Fenestre in the Vésubie
 Lac Fer in the Tinée
 Lac Fourchas in the Tinée
 Lac de la Fous in the Mercantour-Argentera
 Lacs de Frémamorte in the Vésubie
 Lacs de Gialorgues in the Tinée
 Lac de Graveirette in the Vésubie
 Lacs Les Laussets in the Tinée
 Lac Long in the Mercantour-Argentera
 Lacs Malignes in the Tinée
 Lacs Marie in the Tinée
 Lac du Mercantour in the Vésubie
 Lacs des Millefonts in the Valdeblore
 Lac de la Montagnette in the Tinée
 Lacs de Morgon in the Tinée
 Lac Nègre in the Vésubie
 Lac Niré in the Mercantour-Argentera
 Lac Pétrus in the Tinée
 Lacs de Prals in the Vésubie
 Lac de Privola in the Tinée
 Lac de Rabuons in the Tinée
 Lac de Scluos in the Vésubie
 Lac de Tavel in the Tinée
 Lacs de Tenibre in the Tinée
 Lacs des Terres Rouges in the Tinée
 Lac de Trécolpas in the Vésubie
 Lacs Varicles in the Tinée
 Lacs de Vens in the Tinée

Drôme

Isère
 Lac Achard in the massif de Belledonne
 Lac Besson in the massif des Rousses
 Lac Bramant in the massif des Rousses
 Lac Brouffier in the massif du Taillefer
 Lac du Chambon in the massif de l'Oisans
 Lac Claret in the massif de Belledonne
 Lac de la Coche in the massif de Belledonne
 Lac de Croz in the massif de Belledonne
 Lac du Crozet in the massif de Belledonne
 Lac de la Fare in the massif des Rousses
 Lac Faucille in the massif des Rousses
 Lac Fourchu in the massif du Taillefer
 Lac de Grand'Maison at the Vallon de l'Eau d'Olle
 Lac de la Grande-Sître in the massif de Belledonne
 Lac Guichard in the massif des Rousses
 Lac du Lauvitel in the massif des Écrins, 350,000 m²
 Lac Lérié in the massif de l'Oisans
 Lac Merlat in the massif de Belledonne
 Lac du Milieu in the massif des Rousses
 Lac Noir in the massif de l'Oisans
 Lac Noir in the massif des Rousses
 Lac Noir d'Emparis in the massif de l'Oisans
 Lac de Paladru (G)
 Lac du Plan in the massif de l'Oisans
 Lac du Pontet in the massif de l'Oisans
 Lac du Poursollet in the massif du Taillefer
 Lac Potet in the massif des Rousses
 Lac du Verney in the massif des Grandes-Rousses

Savoie
 Grand Lac in the massif des Grandes-Rousses
 Lac d'Aiguebelette
 Lac de l'Arpont in the massif de la Vanoise
 Lac des Assiettes at the Col de la Vanoise
 Lac de la Bailletta at Val d'Isère
 Lac de Bissorte in Valmeinier
 Lac Blanc in the massif du Mont-Cenis
 Lac Blanc in the Vallée du Clou
 Lac Blanc
 Lac Blanc in the massif de la Vanoise
 Lac Blanc in the massif des Grandes-Rousses
 Lac Blanc in the massif de la Vanoise
 Lac du Bourget at Aix-les-Bains
 Lac Brutet in the Vallée du Clou
 Lac Carrelet in the massif des Grandes-Rousses
 Lac des Cerces
 Lac du Chardonnet at Tignes
 Lac de Chasseforêt in the massif de la Vanoise
 Lac du Chevril at Tignes
 Lac du Clos at Moûtiers
 Lac du Clou in the Vallée du Clou
 Lac de la Croix in the massif d'Allevard
 Lac des Évettes in the massif de la Vanoise, 30,000 m²
 Lac de la Fare in the massif des Grandes-Rousses
 Lac de la Girotte in the Beaufortin
 Lac de la Gittaz in the Beaufortin
 Lac de la Glière in the massif de la Vanoise
 Lac Grand-Ban
 Lac du Lait in the massif de la Vanoise
 Lacs de la Leisse at the Vallon de la Leisse
 Lac Long at the Col de la Vanoise
 Lac le Lou in the massif de la Vanoise
 Lac du Milieu in the massif des Grandes-Rousses
 Lac du Mont-Cenis in the massif du Mont-Cenis
 Lac du Mont-Coua in the massif de la Vanoise
 Lacs des Nettes at the Vallon de la Leisse
 Lac Noir in the Vallée du Clou
 Lac Noir in the Vallée de la Sassière
 Lac de l'Ouillette at Val d'Isère
 Lac de la Partie in the massif de la Vanoise
 Lac du Pelve at the glacier du Pelve
 Lac du Plan-d'Amont in the massif de la Vanoise
 Lac du Plan-d'Aval in the massif de la Vanoise
 Lac du Plan-du-Lac in the massif de la Vanoise
 Lacs de la Roche-Ferran in the massif de la Vanoise
 Lac Rond at the Col de la Vanoise
 Lac Rond
 Lac de Roselend in the Beaufortin
 Lac de Saint-André at the Marches
 Lac de Saint-Clair vers La Rochette
 Lac de Saint-Hélène at Saint-Hélène-du-Lac
 Lac de Saint-Guérin in the Beaufortin
 Lac de Saint-Jean-de-Maurienne at Saint-Jean-de-Maurienne
 Lac du Santel at Tignes
 Lac de la Sassière at Tignes
 Lac de Savine in the massif du Mont-Cenis
 Lac de Tignes (H) at Tignes
 Lac de Toeda in the massif de la Vanoise
 Lac Tournant in the massif des Grandes-Rousses
 Lac du Vallon under the Aiguille de Scolette
 Lacs Verdet in the Vallée du Clou

Haute-Savoie
 Lac de l'Aiguillette
 Lac d'Annecy, 27.6 km²
 Lac d'Arvour, south of the Cornettes de Bise
 Lac Bénit at the Mont-Saxonnex, under the chaîne du Bargy
 Marais de la Braille between Saint-Félix and Bloye
 Lac du Brévent at Chamonix
 Lacs de la Cavettaz called Lacs de Passy at Passy
 Lac de Charamillon north of the glacier du Tour
 Lac de la Case
 Lac des Confins
 Lac de Darbon, south of the La Dent d'Oche
 Lac des Dronières at Cruseilles
 Lac de Fontaine at Fontaine
 Lac de Génissiat at the barrage de Génissiat (for the part in Savoy)
 Lac de Gers
 Lac des Gorges du Fier at Montrottier
 Lac de la Griaz at the Houches
 Lac de Jotty at the Esserts
 Lacs Jovet at the Contamines-Montjoie
 Lac Léman (French part)
 Lac de Lessy at the col de la Forclaz-Lessy, under the Pic de Jallouvre
 Étang de Machilly at Machilly
 Lac du Môle between Viuz-en-Sallaz and Saint-Jeoire
 Lac de Montriond, at Montriond
 Lac de la Mouille
 Lac Noir in the massif des Aiguilles-Rouges
 Lac de Pététoz
 Lac des Plagnes
 Lac de Pormenaz in the Passy country park
 Lac de Préssy at Taninges
 Lac de Tavaneuse
 Lac de Vallon, at La Chèvrerie

Ardennes

 Lac des Vieilles Forges

Jura

Ain
 Lac de Vouglans

Doubs
Lac de Malpas
Lac de Remoray
Lac de Saint-Point

Jura
 Lac de l'Assencière
 Lac des Bez
 Lac de Chanon
 Lac à la Dame
 Lac de la Fauge
 Lac du Fort-du-Plasne
 Lac de Viry

Massif Central

Aveyron
 Étang de la Brienne
 Lac de Maury

Cantal
 Lac de Bort-les-Orgues (H)

Creuse
 Lac de Vassivière (H)

Haute-Vienne
 Lac de Saint-Pardoux

Hérault
 Lac d'Avène

Lot
 Lac du Tolerme

Lozère
 Étang de Barrandon
 Lac de Ganivet
 Lac du Moulinet
 Lac de Naussac
 Lac de Villefort

Puy-de-Dôme
 Étang de Lachamp
 Gour de Tazenat (V)
 Lac d'Aydat (V)
 Lac de Bourdouze
 Lac Chambon (V)
 Lac Chauvet (V)
 Lac de Guéry (V)
 Lac des Hermines
 Lac de Montcineyre
 Lac Pavin (V), Besse-en-Chandesse, 440,000 m²
 Lac de Servière (V)

Tarn
 Lac du Laouzas

Pyrénées

Ariège
 Étang d'Araing
 Étang de Brouquenat
 Étang de Peyregrand
 Étang des Redouneilles des brebis
 Étang des Redouneilles des vaches
 Étang Long
 Étangs de Neych
 Lac de Gnioure
 Lac d'Izourt
 Lac de Mondély

Haute-Garonne 
 Lac d'Espingo
 Lac d'Oô
 Lac du Portillon

Hautes-Pyrénées 
 Gaube Lake
 Lac d'Arredoun
 Lac d'Aubert
 Lac d'Aumar
 Lac d'Aygue Rouye
 Lac du Barbat
 Lac de Bareilles
 Lac de Barroude
 Lac de Batbielh
 Lac Bleu de Lesponne
 Lac de Caderolles
 Lac du Campana
 Lac de Cap-de-Long
 Lac d'Estaing
 Lac de Madamète
 Lac de Migouélou
 Lac d'Oredon
 Lac de l'Oule
 Lac d'Ourrec
 Lac du Pourtet
 Lac Nère
 Lac de Suyen
 Réservoir des Laquets

Pyrénées-Atlantiques 
 Lac d'Ansabère
 Lacs d'Arrémoulit
 Lac d'Arrious
 Lac d'Artouste
 Lacs de Batboucou
 Lac Bersau
 Lac de Bious-Artigues
 Lac de Castet
 Lac de Fabrèges
 Lac Gentau
 Lac d'Isabe
 Lac de Saint-Pée-sur-Nivelle
 Lacs d'Arrémoulit
 Lacs de Batboucou
 Lacs de Carnau
 Lac de Saint-Pée-sur-Nivelle

Pyrénées-Orientales 
 Estany de la Balmeta
 Estany de la Pradella
 Étang de Canet-Saint-Nazaire 
 Étang du Lanoux
 Étang de Leucate
 Lac d'Aude
 Lac de Coumasse
 Lac de Matemale (2.3 km²) in the commune of Matemale

Vosges

 Lac de Bouzey
 Lac de Gérardmer (G) : 1.16 km²
 Lac de Longemer (G) : 0.76 km²
 Lac de la Plaine
 Lac de Retournemer

Lakes in plains

The lakes in this category can be natural (N) or designed to be used as reservoirs (R).

Basin of the Garonne 
Lac de Pareloup (R)

Basin of the Loire 
 Lac de Chambon
 Lac de Chaumeçon
 Étangs de Sologne
 Lac de Grand-Lieu (N)
 Lac de Pannecière
 Lac de Saint-Agnan

Basin of the Moselle 
 Étang de Hanau
 Lac de Pierre-Percée

Basin of the Nièvre
 Étangs de Vaux et de Baye

Basin of the Seine 
 Lac du Bourdon
 Lac du Der-Chantecoq (R)
 Lac du Crescent
 Lac de Gravelle
 Lac de Saint-Mandé
 Lac de Villegusien
 Lac de Viry-Châtillon

Basin of the Rhine

Bas-Rhin
 Lac du Baggersee

Haut-Rhin
 Fischboedle
 Lac d'Alfeld
 Lac du Ballon
 Lac de Kruth-Wildenstein
 Lac du Lachtelweiher
 Lac de la Lauch
 Lac de Michelbach
 Lac Noir (Vosges)
 Lac des Perches

Meuse
 Lac de Madine

Basin of the Rhône 

 Étang de la Bonde
 Étangs des Dombes
 Lac de Sainte-Croix (R)
 Lac des Sapins (R)

Others
 Lac de Guerlédan in Brittany
 Réservoir Saint-Michel in Brittany

Coastal lakes

The lakes close to the sea can be filled with fresh water (F) or sea water (S).

English Channel

Pas-de-Calais
Lac des Miroirs

Atlantic Ocean 
 Étang d'Aureilhan
 Étang de Cazaux et de Sanguinet
 Étang de Lacanau
 Lac de Biscarrosse et de Parentis
 Lac d'Hourtin-Carcans

Mediterranean Sea 
 Étang de Berre
 Étang de Thau/Bassin de Thau

Corsica
Lac de Bettaniella
Lac du Cinto
Lac de Goria
Lac de Nino
Lac de l'Oriente

See also

List of lakes in the Kerguelen Islands
List of bodies of water of Corsica

References

France
Lakes